Craig Titley is an American writer for film. His work includes Cheaper by the Dozen, Scooby-Doo, and Percy Jackson & the Olympians: The Lightning Thief. He graduated from Mattoon High School, Eastern Illinois University, and University of Southern California with a master's degree. He got his Doctorate at Pacifica Graduate Institute.

Filmography

Film

Television

References

External links

Living people
American male screenwriters
People from Mattoon, Illinois
Eastern Illinois University alumni
University of Southern California alumni
Screenwriters from Illinois
Year of birth missing (living people)